The PPCD acronym may mean:
 Christian-Democratic National Peasants' Party (Romania)
 Christian-Democratic People's Party (Moldova)
 Posterior polymorphous corneal dystrophy